Ros Serey Sothear becomes a popular artist for movie soundtracks among film directors, taking Huoy Mea's old position. Of the 18 films listed, 4 films  are in existence, 6 have been remade, and 8 have not yet been remade.

References 
 

1966
Films
Cambodian